Tommy Clowers (born September 2, 1972) is an American professional FMX (Freestyle Motocross) rider.

At the 2000 X Games (X Games VI), on August 18 at San Francisco, California, Clowers achieved the highest jump in Moto X Step Up, 10.67 m (39 ft) (Step Up World Record of 35 ft).

He was undefeated in Moto X Step Up for three years in a row in 2000, 2001 and 2002, before FMX rider Matt Buyten defeated him at X Games IX (2003). Clowers has 8 X Games medals overall (6 in XG, 2 in WXG).

Media appearances
MTX Mototrax (2004)
The Great Ride Open, seasons 1/2 (2007/08)

Personal life
Clowers lives in Ramona, California.

He is married to Melissa, and they have two children.

References

Living people
1972 births
American motorcycle racers
Freestyle motocross riders